Gårekneet Ridge is a rock ridge  south of Garenevkalven Nunatak in the Payer Mountains of Queen Maud Land, Antarctica. It was photographed from the air by the Third German Antarctic Expedition (1938–39), mapped by Norwegian cartographers from surveys and air photos by the Sixth Norwegian Antarctic Expedition (1956–60) and named Gårekneet.

References

Ridges of Queen Maud Land
Princess Astrid Coast